Solid phase microextraction, or SPME, is a solid phase extraction sampling technique that involves the use of a fiber coated with an extracting phase, that can be a liquid (polymer) or a solid (sorbent), which extracts different kinds of analytes (including both volatile and non-volatile) from different kinds of media, that can be in liquid or gas phase. The quantity of analyte extracted by the fibre is proportional to its concentration in the sample as long as equilibrium is reached or, in case of short time pre-equilibrium, with help of convection or agitation.

Analysis
After extraction, the SPME fiber is transferred to the injection port of separating instruments, such as a gas chromatography and mass spectrometry, where desorption of the analyte takes place and analysis is carried out.

Advantages
The attraction of SPME is that the extraction is fast, simple, can be done usually without solvents, and detection limits can reach parts per trillion (ppt) levels for certain compounds.  SPME also has great potential for field applications; on-site sampling can be done even by nonscientists without the need to have gas chromatography-mass spectrometry equipment at each location.  When properly stored, samples can be analyzed days later in the laboratory without significant loss of volatiles.

Fiber Coatings 
The coating on the SPME fiber can be selected to improve sensitivity for specific analytes of interest; ideally the sorbent layer will have a high affinity for the target analytes. There are many commercially available SPME fiber coatings that are combinations of polydimethylsiloxane, divinylbenzene, Carboxen, polyacrylate, and polyethylene glycol. However, one downside to many of the commercially available SPME fibers is that they tend to be physically brittle due to their composition. Depending on the characteristics of the target analytes, certain properties of the coating improve extraction such as polarity, thickness, and surface area. The sample matrix can also influence the fiber coating selection. Based on the sample and analytes of interest, the fiber may need to tolerate direct immersion as opposed to a headspace extraction.

References

Further reading
 Janusz Pawliszyn: Handbook of Solid Phase Microextraction, Chemical Industry Press, 2009.
 Pawliszyn J.: Solid Phase Microextraction: Theory and Practice, Wiley-VCH, 1997.
 Pawliszyn J.: Applications of Solid Phase Microextraction, Royal Society of Chemistry, 1999.

Interactive lectures 

 Introduction to Solid Phase Microextraction
 Quantification using Solid Phase Microextraction

Laboratory techniques